Khamoshh... Khauff Ki Raat (transl. Silence... Night of Fear) is a 2005 Indian Hindi-language mystery thriller film directed and produced by Deepak Tijori. It was a remake of James Mangold's 2003 Hollywood psychological thriller Identity. The film received poor reviews from critics.

Plot 
This is a double sided story, narrating the present with flashback simultaneously. Psychiatrist Dr. Sakhshi Sagar suddenly discovers evidence of a case of a serial killer who was in her treatment. The killer will be hanged soon. Dr. Sagar tries to prove that the killer is a mental patient with dual personalities. She calls an emergency meeting at midnight with a Judge and higher officials before the execution. On the other side, in a stormy night, various people passing through this highway get diverted to a haunted motel for shelter. They meet the only receptionist-cum-bearer Adi. A husband with his injured wife and step son came there. Actually, Avinash hit the lady while driving. He is the bodyguard of actress and model Kashmira. Avinash takes them into the motel and tries to give medical aid, although Kashmira does not agree. A young honeymoon couple Varun and Mahek, bar dancer Sonia and Jatin, a police inspector, who is transferring one convict in his custody to another prison, also take shelter at this motel. The receptionist manages to accommodate all of them in various rooms. One person within the group starts killing the guests one by one and on the other side, Dr Sagar reveals the past of the murderer.

Cast 
 Juhi Chawla as Dr. Sakhshi Sagar
 Shilpa Shetty as Sonia Malhotra
 Rakhi Sawant as Kashmira
 Makarand Deshpande as Manas
 Avtar Gill as Judge
 Rajat Bedi as Varun Bohra
 Shawar Ali as Jatin Saluja (Senior Inspector)
 Vrajesh Hirjee as Aditya ‘Adi’ Behl (Motel receptionist)
 Kelly Dorji as Criminal
 Vishwajeet Pradhan as Sukhvinder Kaur 
 Rajeev Singh as Avinash Mushran (Kashmira's Bodyguard)

Music
Man Bhanwara - Sunidhi Chauhan
Love Me Baby - Sunidhi Chauhan
Man Bhanwara (Remix) - Sunidhi Chauhan
Mann Bhanwara (Instrumental)

References

External links 

2005 films
2000s Hindi-language films
Films directed by Deepak Tijori
Films scored by Jatin–Lalit
Indian remakes of American films
Indian mystery thriller films